Joggle means to shake to and fro, to rock something about, and can be used both transitively and intransitively in several ways, including:

 to joggle along, walk along with short, jerky movements (Oxford English Dictionary, 2003)
 Joggle (architecture), a joint or projection that interlocks blocks
 Joggle bending, a type of offset bend in construction.
 Joggling, a pastime that combines juggling and jogging.
 Joggling board, a type of bouncy furniture.
 Joggling (pottery), a method of pot decoration.
 "Joggle Along", a Cornish children's game, (The Folk-lore Journal Vol. 57, 1888), sung to a nursery rhyme of the same name.